Ehsan Peighambari is a former wushu taolu athlete from Iran. At the 2010 Asian Games in Guangzhou, China, he became the first Iranian athlete to win a medal in wushu taolu, having won the bronze medal in men's changquan. He also won a bronze medal in men's changquan at the 2008 Beijing Wushu Tournament, a silver medal in daoshu and gunshu combined at the 2010 World Combat Games, and a bronze medal in changquan at the 2013 Islamic Solidarity Games.

See also 
 List of Asian Games medalists in wushu

References

External links 

 Ehsan Peighambari on Olympedia

1998 births
Living people
Iranian wushu practitioners
Wushu practitioners at the 2010 Asian Games
Wushu practitioners at the 2014 Asian Games
Medalists at the 2010 Asian Games
Asian Games medalists in wushu
Asian Games bronze medalists for Iran
Competitors at the 2008 Beijing Wushu Tournament
Islamic Solidarity Games competitors for Iran